The 2021 UMass Dartmouth Corsairs football team represented the University of Massachusetts Dartmouth as a member of the Massachusetts State Collegiate Athletic Conference (MASCAC) during the 2021 NCAA Division III football season. The Corsairs, led by 15th-year head coach Mark Robichaud, played their home games at Cressy Field in Dartmouth, Massachusetts.

Previous season
The Corsairs 2020 season was cancelled due to the COVID-19 pandemic.

Schedule

Game summaries

at Husson

Dean

at Framingham State

Worcester State

at Western Connecticut State

Massachusetts Maritime

at Westfield State

Fitchburg State

at Bridgewater State

Plymouth State

Alfred State

Personnel

Coaching staff

Roster

Statistics

Team

Individual leaders

Offense

Special teams

References

UMass Dartmouth
UMass Dartmouth Corsairs football seasons
UMass Dartmouth Corsairs football